The Makar-class survey catamarans are a series of six 500 ton steel hull/aluminium superstructure Hydrographic Survey Catamarans being built by Alcock Ashdown (Gujarat) Ltd at its Bhavnagar shipyard for the Indian Navy. The ships are designed by an Australian naval architecture firm Sea Transport Solutions, which is based on Queensland's Gold Coast. The deal was canceled due to the  extensive delays as the Navy was not satisfied with the timeline and a fresh award for construction of another class of survey vessels to the GRSE has also been undertaken.

Description
The ships are intended to undertake coastal hydrographic survey, required for production of nautical charts and publications aimed at improving navigation through waters closer to coasts. The ships are also capable of limited coastal defence role in an emergency, limited search and rescue and limited ocean research. The ships are equipped with standard hydrographic survey equipment such as advanced electronic positioning system, multi-beam swath sounding systems and sub-bottom profiler. The ships also carry two survey motor boats along with Kongsberg Maritime's Hugin 1000 Autonomous underwater vehicle (AUV) for closer investigations.

The catamarans are propelled by four Cummins engines as well as two bow thrusters. The entire propulsion, navigational and power management packages of the vessels are integrated in a L&T supplied single state-of-art integrated platform management system. The ship is also equipped with sophisticated Integrated Bridge System from L&T. The ships have ergonomic accommodation for the six officers and 44 sailors.

Construction
Alcock Ashdown (Gujarat) Ltd was awarded this contract, worth  on 28 December 2006 through open competitive bidding, beating others like Larsen & Toubro, ABG Shipyard and Garden Reach Shipbuilders & Engineers. As per original term of contract, the first vessel was to be delivered by 6 April 2009, while the remaining five vessels were to be delivered within a year from 6 July 2009. This was later rescheduled, the revised delivery period of vessels is from September 2011 to March 2013.
The INS Meen is under construction. The remaining four are awaiting administrative clarification.

Ships of the class

Cancellation of the deal 
Indian Navy cancelled ₹8000 crore (US$1.1 billion) deal with Alcock Ashdown over 10 year delays in a contract to supply of the six vessels. According to Navy officials only one of the vessels has been delivered and there is no sign or any timeline for the other 5 ships.

Further, the Ministry of Defence has awarded another contract for the construction of four Survey Vessels for Indian Navy to Garden Reach Shipbuilders & Engineers (GRSE) Limited, Kolkata after it became the L1 bidder in the competitive bidding. These ships have a displacement of 3,300 tonnes. Therefore, these ships are likely to be more advanced and outperform the Makar Class which has a displacement of only 500 tonnes. So, this further reduces the chances of the completion of the deal and hence the Makar class will consist of only 1 ship.

See also
L&T fast interceptor craft
Solas Marine Fast Interceptor Boat
ABG Interceptor Class fast attack crafts
Couach fast interceptor boats
GSL/GRSE series of Interceptor Boats
Cochin Fast Patrol Vessels
ABG Class Cadet Training Ship

GSL class offshore patrol vessel

References

External links
In pictures: Made in Gujarat,first hydrographic survey vessel ‘Makar’ supplied to Navy
Official website

 
Ships built in India
Auxiliary research ship classes
Military catamarans